Nana Opoku Ampomah (born 2 January 1996) is a Ghanaian professional footballer who plays as a winger for German  club Fortuna Düsseldorf.

Club career
He is an old student of Presbyterian Senior High School, Tema.

He made his debut for Waasland-Beveren in July 2016 against Sporting Charleroi in the Belgian First Division A.

References 

1996 births
Living people
Ghanaian footballers
Ghana international footballers
Association football midfielders
S.K. Beveren players
Fortuna Düsseldorf players
Royal Antwerp F.C. players
Belgian Pro League players
Bundesliga players
2. Bundesliga players
Ghanaian expatriate footballers
Expatriate footballers in Belgium
Ghanaian expatriate sportspeople in Belgium
Expatriate footballers in Germany
Ghanaian expatriate sportspeople in Germany